Kojo-Korum is a village in Batken Region of Kyrgyzstan. It is part of the Kadamjay District. Its population was 72 in 2021. Nearby towns and villages include Sovet and Böjöy.

References

External links 
Satellite map at Maplandia.com

Populated places in Batken Region